Le Même Soleil (English: The Same Sun), is a 2010 album recorded by French singer Grégoire. It provided four singles : Danse, Soleil, La Promesse, a duet with Jean-Jacques Goldman and On s'envolera. The album entered the French Physical Chart at number one, selling about 23,600 units, then dropped and fell off the top ten after four weeks.

Track listing
All tracks written by Grégoire Boissenot.

Charts

Weekly charts

Year-end charts

References

2010 albums
Grégoire (musician) albums
French-language albums
Warner Music France albums
My Major Company albums